Tetracyanoethylene (TCNE) is organic compound with the formula . It is a colorless solid, although samples are often off-white. It is an important member of the cyanocarbons.

Synthesis and reactions
TCNE is prepared by brominating malononitrile in the presence of potassium bromide to give the KBr-complex, and dehalogenating with copper.

Oxidation of TCNE with hydrogen peroxide gives the corresponding epoxide, which has unusual properties.

In the presence of base, TCNE reacts with malononitrile to give salts of pentacyanopropenide:
C2(CN)2 + CH2(CN)2 -> [(NC)2C-C(CN)-C(CN)2]- + CN- + 2H+

Redox chemistry
TCNE is an electron acceptor. Cyano groups have low energy π* orbitals, and the presence of four such groups, with their π systems (conjugated) to the central  double bond, gives rise to an electrophilic alkene. TCNE is reduced at -0.27 V vs ferrocene/ferrocenium:
C2(CN)4 + e- -> [C2(CN)4]-
Because of its ability to accept an electron, TCNE has been used to prepare numerous charge-transfer salts.

Safety
TCNE hydrolyzes in moist air to give hydrogen cyanide and should be handled accordingly.

References

Alkene derivatives
Nitriles
Superconductors